Niehagen is a village in the municipality of Ahrenshoop on the Fischland-Darß-Zingst peninsula in the German state of Mecklenburg-West Pomerania.

On the steep coast near Althagen/Niehagen lies the Bakelberg knoll. At  it is the highest point of Fischland.

The sculptor, Gerhard Marcks, lived and worked in Niehagen in the 1930s, at Boddenweg 1.

External links 

Vorpommern-Rügen
Villages in Mecklenburg-Western Pomerania